Wisconsin cheese is cheese made in the U.S. state of Wisconsin. Wisconsin has a long tradition and history of cheese  production and it is widely associated in popular culture with cheese and the dairy industry.

History

Wisconsin's cheesemaking tradition dates back to the 19th century. European immigrants who settled in Wisconsin were drawn to its fertile fields.

Soon, dairy farms sprang up around Wisconsin, and farmers began producing cheese to preserve excess milk. In 1841, Anne Pickett established Wisconsin's first commercial cheese factory, using milk from neighbors' cows. A century later, Wisconsin was home to more than 1,500 cheese factories, which produced more than 500 million pounds of cheese per year.

Wisconsin has long been identified with cheese; in the words of a 2006 New York Times article, "Cheese is the state’s history, its pride, its self-deprecating, sometimes goofy, cheesehead approach to life."  Wisconsin has claimed the title of the largest cheese-producing state in the United States since 1910. In 2006, Wisconsin produced 2.4 billion pounds of cheese and held onto its top ranking, despite concerns that California's faster-growing cheese industry would soon surpass Wisconsin's production.  In 2007, Wisconsin again held onto its lead, which had begun to grow slightly.  In 2010, Wisconsin's cheese production rose to 2.6 billion pounds (requiring the state cheese industry to import a substantial amount of milk from other states to meet production needs). In 2014, Wisconsin produced 2.9 billion pounds of cheese, accounting for 25.4% of all cheese produced in the U.S.

As of 2013, Wisconsin continues to be the largest cheese producer in the United States, making over 600 different cheese varieties. Wisconsin is the only U.S. state that requires that a licensed cheesemaker supervise the making of commercial cheese. It is also the only state to offer a master cheesemaker program, which is patterned on the rigorous standards of similar programs in Europe.

See also

 Cheese curd
 Colby cheese
 Cold pack cheese
 Cheesehead
 Cuisine of Wisconsin

References

Further reading 
 Apps, Jerold W. Cheese: The Making of a Wisconsin Tradition. Amherst, Wis.: Amherst Press, 1998.
 Emery, J. Q. "The Swiss Cheese Industry in Wisconsin", Wisconsin Magazine of History, vol. 10, no, 1 (September 1926): 42–52.
 Norton, James R. and Becca Dilley. The Master Cheesemakers of Wisconsin. Madison, Wis.: University of Wisconsin Press, 2009.

External links
 Wisconsin Milk Marketing Board
 History of Cheese in Wisconsin
 The Rise of Cheese in America's Dairyland
 Wisconsin Milk Marketing Board - Cheese Statistics

American cheeses
Cuisine of Wisconsin
Wisconsin culture